This article shows all participating team squads at the 2003 Men's European Water Polo Championship, held in Kranj, Slovenia from 6–13 June 2003.

























References

Men
Men's European Water Polo Championship
European Water Polo Championship squads